Anabarilius longicaudatus is a species of ray-finned fish in the genus Anabarilius. They are benthopelagic freshwater fish found only in the Pearl River in southern China. They grow to  TL.

References

longicaudatus
Fish described in 1986
Freshwater fish of China
Endemic fauna of China